The fourth USS Fulton (SP-247), later USS SP-247, was a commercial tug built in 1909. She was commissioned by the United States Navy and served as a minesweeper in 1917 in the Third Naval District and returned to her previous owners two years later. She remained in service, latterly as Catherine Carroll, at least into the 1960s.

Construction and commercial service
Fulton was built as a steel-hulled tug in 1909 by the Staten Island Shipbuilding Company at Port Richmond on Staten Island, New York as Yard Number 489.

The tug was built for the Delaware, Lackawanna and Western Railroad Co. to tow barges carrying rail cars. She was registered at New York, with US Official Number 207060 and call-sign LBHQ. The vessel was named after Robert Fulton who was honored in New York City's Hudson–Fulton Celebration in 1909 on the centenary of his development of practical steamship technology.

World War I service
The U.S. Navy acquired her under charter on 30 April 1917 for service as a Section mine sweeper. After arming with a single 1-pounder gun, she was commissioned as USS Fulton (SP-247) on 22 September with two officers and sixteen men assigned to the Third Naval District.  On 11 April 1918 her official name was reduced to SP-247.

The Navy returned Fulton to her previous owner on 12 August 1919.

Return to commercial service
In 1919 Fulton resumed service with the Delaware, Lackawanna and Western Railroad. By 1958 she had been sold to Tug Fulton Corp., New York and renamed Catherine Carroll. The tug continued in service until at least 1964.

Notes

References

External links
 Photo of tug Fulton with railcar barge under the Brooklyn Bridge, East River, New York Harbor - ca. 1952

Minesweepers of the United States Navy
World War I minesweepers of the United States
Ships built in Staten Island
1909 ships
Delaware, Lackawanna and Western Railroad